Shiva is a 1990 Indian Hindi-language action film written and directed by Ram Gopal Varma. It was a remake of Varma's debut Telugu film, Siva (1989). The film has Nagarjuna (in his Hindi debut) and Amala in lead roles. The film became a blockbuster. The success led to Ram Gopal Varma directing a prequel in 2006.

Plot
The film opens to a classroom in a (fictional) VAS college of Arts & Sciences. After the classes, upon the directions of a college student JD, a bunch of goons led by Ganesh savagely assaults a group of students right outside the college gate. It's later made clear that JD was settling some campus scores and that the incident resulted in at least one student leaving the college, deepening the fear for JD in the campus.

It turns out that JD is the (unopposed) president of the college students' union and the leader of a notorious campus gang, powerful enough to prevent the college Principal from taking disciplinary actions against their unsavory conduct, which includes eve-teasing and insulting professors. JD's connections, through Ganesh, reaches a gangster named Bhavani Chaudhury, whose criminal network lends muscle to a local politician Tilak Dhari.

Shiva is a new student at college. He joins a small group of friends, including Prakash and Asha. Shiva's confident gait and tough attitude leads to JD locking horns with him. An inevitable fight ensues, in which Shiva and friends beat up JD's gang, in broad daylight within the campus. Emboldened by the incident, Shiva's friends plan to fight the students' union elections. Shiva proposes the nerdy friend Naresh to stand for the president-ship. He also rebuffs Ganesh's initial warning to stay out of politics.

When Ganesh attempts to use force, Shiva beats him back too. The matter comes before Bhavani. Bhavani is mildly annoyed, but he studies Shiva as a potential replacement for JD. At his behest, Naresh is assaulted and rendered unable to run. At this point, Shiva accepts the nomination and decides to run.

Meanwhile, Bhavani has other troubles. He refuses to side with a worker's union leader Krishna Rao. Krishna Rao takes his plight to Shiva; Shiva agrees to help in return for muscle, and Rao provides this by calling upon the workers. Around this time, Asha expresses a romantic interest in Shiva. The friendship progresses, and they eventually marry.

The stage is now set. Bhavani launches a set of sniper attacks on those close to Shiva. Shiva retaliates in kind and takes out many of Bhavani's leaders. Tilak Dhari notices that Shiva is launching a fitting response to Bhavani and decides to stop supporting Bhavani. Angered, humiliated and defeated, Bhavani strikes Shiva's home and finds Asha. When he learns that Ganesh has already been presented in court and an arrest warrant has been issued for him, Bhavani kills Asha, also Tilakdhari for betrayal and leaves.

A final fight ensues in which eventually, Shiva manages to kill Bhavani, ridding the city of one of its most terrifying anti-social elements, while personally coming to terms with the fact that he has lost almost everything in the bargain.

Cast

Nagarjuna as Shiva
Amala as Asha
Paresh Rawal as Tilakdhari Azaad
Raghuvaran as Bhavani
J. D. Chakravarthy as Jagdish Dave "J.D."
Tanikella Bharani as Nanaji
Iftekhar as Principal
Chandrashekhar  as Lecturer
Girija Shankar as Inspector Tejesh
Raj Zutshi as Prakash
Ajit Vachani as Krishna Rao
Goga Kapoor as Kanta Prasad
Brij Gopal as Ganesh
Dilip Dhawan as Shiva's Brother
Chinna as Chotu
Ramjagan as Naresh
Brahmaji as Kanta Prasad's Driver
Uttej as Yadagiri
Rohini Hattangadi as Prakash's Mother
Beena Banerjee as Shiva's Sister-In-Law
Baby Sushma as Keerthi

Production

The college campus depicted in the film was shot at Acharya N. G. Ranga Agricultural University in Hyderabad.

Soundtrack

Music was composed by Ilaiyaraaja. Lyrics were written by Majrooh Sultanpuri. All songs are blockbuster hits. Music was released on Venus Cassettes.

References

External links
 
 Documentary on Shiva

1990 films
Films directed by Ram Gopal Varma
Films set in Hyderabad, India
Hindi remakes of Telugu films
Films scored by Ilaiyaraaja
1990s Hindi-language films
Indian political thriller films
Indian action thriller films
1990 action thriller films
1990s political thriller films